The fifth season of the American television drama series Sons of Anarchy premiered on September 11, 2012, and concluded on December 4, 2012, after 13 episodes aired on cable network FX. Created by Kurt Sutter, it is about the lives of a close-knit outlaw motorcycle club operating in Charming, a fictional town in California's Central Valley. The show centers on protagonist Jackson "Jax" Teller (Charlie Hunnam), the president of the club, who begins questioning the club and himself after the deaths of several SAMCRO members at the hand of former club president, Clay Morrow (Ron Perlman).

The premiere ("Sovereign"), directed by series executive producer and principal director Paris Barclay and written by series creator and executive producer Kurt Sutter, was one of the highest-rated telecasts in FX's history.

Sons of Anarchy is the story of the Teller-Morrow family of Charming, California, as well as other members of the Sons of Anarchy Motorcycle Club, Redwood Original (SAMCRO), their families, various Charming townspeople, allied and rival gangs, associates, and law agencies that undermine or support SAMCRO's legal and illegal enterprises.

Plot
In retaliation for the death of Veronica Pope (Laroy's girlfriend, who was also the daughter of powerful Oakland kingpin Damon Pope), the Niners attack SAMCRO and ambush a cargo shipment. With the death of Piney Winston and the growing conflict between the Niners and SAMCRO, along with several home invasions targeting people linked to the Club, Jax is forced to meet with Damon Pope, to face a new threat unlike anything SAMCRO has ever faced.

Cast and characters

 

 
 
Sons of Anarchy is the story of the Teller-Morrow family of Charming, California, as well as the other members of Sons of Anarchy Motorcycle Club, Redwood Original (SAMCRO), their families, various Charming townspeople,  allied and rival gangs, associates, and law agencies that undermine or support SAMCRO's legal and illegal enterprises.

Main cast
 Charlie Hunnam as Jackson "Jax" Teller 
 Katey Sagal as Gemma Teller Morrow 
 Mark Boone Junior as Robert "Bobby Elvis" Munson 
 Dayton Callie as Wayne Unser 
 Kim Coates as Alex "Tig" Trager 
 Tommy Flanagan as Filip "Chibs" Telford 
 Ryan Hurst as Harry "Opie" Winston 
 Theo Rossi as Juan-Carlos "Juice" Ortiz 
 Maggie Siff as Tara Knowles-Teller 
 Ron Perlman as Clarence "Clay" Morrow

Special guest cast
 Jimmy Smits as Nero Padilla 
 Rockmond Dunbar as Lieutenant Eli Roosevelt 
 Harold Perrineau as Damon Pope 
 Benito Martinez as Luis Torres
 Danny Trejo as Romero "Romeo" Parada 
 Drea de Matteo as Wendy Case 
 Donal Logue as Lee Toric 
 Walton Goggins as Venus Van Dam 
 Sonny Barger as Lenny "The Pimp" Janowitz

Recurring cast
 David LaBrava as Happy Lowman
 Christopher Douglas Reed as Philip "Filthy Phil" Russell 
 Chuck Zito as Frankie Diamonds 
 Michael Marisi Ornstein as Chuck Marstein 
 Winter Ave Zoli as Lyla Winston 
 Chris Browning as GoGo 
 Kurt Yaeger as Greg "The Peg"
 Wanda De Jesus as Carla 
 Niko Nicotera as George "Rat Boy" Skogstorm 
 Billy Brown as August Marks 
 Reynaldo Gallegos as Fiasco 
 McNally Sagal as Margaret Murphy 
 Kurt Sutter as "Big" Otto Delaney
 Robin Weigert as Ally Lowen 
 Walter Wong as Chris "V-Lin" Von Lin 
 Merle Dandridge as Rita Roosevelt 
 Jeff Kober as Jacob Hale Jr. 
 Timothy V. Murphy as Galen O'Shay 
 Kenneth Choi as Henry Lin
 Emilio Rivera as Marcus Alvarez 
 Kristen Renton as Ima 
 Michael Beach as T.O. Cross

Guest stars 
 Rachel Miner as Dawn Trager 
 Ashley Tisdale as Emma Jean
 Joel McHale as Warren 
 Dave Navarro as Arcadio Nerona 
 Mo McRae as Tyler Yost 
 Marshall Allman as Devin Price
 Olivia Burnette as Homeless Woman

Production
Although Sons of Anarchy is set in Northern California's Central Valley, it is filmed primarily at Occidental Studios Stage 5A in North Hollywood. Main sets located there include the clubhouse, St. Thomas Hospital, and Jax's house. The production rooms at the studio used by the writing staff also double as the Charming police station. External scenes are often filmed nearby in Sun Valley and Tujunga.

On his Sons of Anarchy YouTube channel Sutterinksoa, Kurt Sutter has stated that he began writing scripts for season 5, episodes one and two as early as March 1, 2012. It was also announced that Chuck Zito would be joining the Sons cast as a Nomad traveling through Charming. Another announced cast addition for season five is Jimmy Smits. Smits, known for his work in L.A. Law, NYPD Blue, The West Wing and Dexter, will play an escort service owner and former Latino gang member who becomes a mentor to Jax. Harold Perrineau joined the cast in May as the villain Damon Pope.

With Dave Erickson's departure, Kurt Sutter remained the only writer to have been writing the series since the first season.

Episodes

Reception
Season five received favourable reviews and has a rating of 72 on the review aggregator site Metacritic. Review aggregator website Rotten Tomatoes has an approval rating of 83% based on 23 reviews. The site's critical consensus reads: "Still dangerous and proud of it, Sons of Anarchy builds upon its ferocious attitude with impressive finesse." Ken Tucker of Entertainment Weekly praised the series by calling it a "richly detailed portrait of self-righteous villainy".

Home media release
The fifth season was released in the United States on DVD and Blu-ray on August 27, 2013.

References

External links
 Sons of Anarchy at FXNetworks.com
 

 
2012 American television seasons